Mountain Line may refer to:

 Mountain railway, a railway that operates in a mountainous region 
 Mountain Line (Arizona), a bus service in Flagstaff, Arizona, U.S.
 Mountain Line (Montana), a public transport system in Missoula, Montana, U.S.
 Mountain Line Transit Authority, in Morgantown, West Virginia, U.S.
 Taichung line, or Mountain line, in Taiwan

See also